The 2016–17 EFL League Two (referred to as the Sky Bet League Two for sponsorship reasons) is the 13th season of the Football League Two under its current title and the 24th season under its current league division format. The fixtures were announced on 22 June 2016.

Team changes

To League Two
Promoted from National League
 Cheltenham Town
 Grimsby Town
Relegated from League One
 Doncaster Rovers
 Blackpool
 Colchester United
 Crewe Alexandra

From League Two
Promoted to League One
 Northampton Town
 Oxford United
 Bristol Rovers
 AFC Wimbledon
Relegated to National League
 Dagenham & Redbridge
 York City

Teams

Managerial changes

League table

Play-offs

Results

Top goalscorers 
Source: BBC SportCorrect as of 28 May 2017

Monthly Awards

References

 
EFL League Two seasons
4
Eng

3